The Black Parachute is a 1944 American war film directed by Lew Landers and starring John Carradine, Osa Massen and Larry Parks.

The Chicago Daily Tribune said the film had "an engrossing story and is graced by excellent acting - notably that of the young Larry Parks". The Los Angeles Times said the film was "very tensely contrived for its type".

References

External links
 
 

1944 films
1940s war drama films
American black-and-white films
American war drama films
Columbia Pictures films
Films directed by Lew Landers
Films scored by Mario Castelnuovo-Tedesco
World War II films made in wartime
1944 drama films
1940s English-language films